"She Said" is the second single from British musician Plan B's second album The Defamation of Strickland Banks — a concept album whose songs tell the fictitious tale of a sharp-suited British soul singer who finds fame with bitter-sweet love songs, but then loses everything when he ends up in prison for a crime he didn't commit. The single was released as a digital download and on CD single on 24 February 2010. "She Said" was the sixteenth best selling British single of 2010.

Background
"She Said" began to receive increasing amounts of radio airplay throughout February and March 2010. BBC Radio 1 and Radio Gibraltar in particular was supportive of the track up until its release. Plan B performed the single on 12 March 2010 edition of Friday Night with Jonathan Ross. He also performed on Conan on 19 April 2011. The song was also featured in the start of the pilot episode of Whitney.

Music video
The music video for "She Said" was directed by Daniel Wolfe and shows the soul singer Strickland Banks, played by Plan B, in court following the events of the "Stay Too Long" video. The video also stars actress Vicky McClure as Strickland Banks' girlfriend and Kaya Scodelario as the female lead.

Chart performance
On 4 April 2010, the single debuted on the UK Singles Chart at a current peak of number three, making "She Said", Plan B's most successful single to date. The single remained at number three for two consecutive weeks before falling to number four on 18 April 2010, where it remained for two weeks. The single then climbed back to the peak of number three on 2 May 2010, where it remained for yet another two weeks. On 16 May 2010, the single fell three places to number six before falling a further two places to number eight on its eighth week in the top 10.

The single also debuted on the Irish Singles Chart on 1 April 2010 at number 35, where it remained for two consecutive weeks. On 15 April 2010, the single climbed 15 places to number 20, before climbing a further eight places to number 12 the following week. The single remained at number 12 for three consecutive weeks before climbing three places to number nine on 13 May 2010, marking Plan B's first top 10 hit in Ireland. On its second week in the top 10, the single climbed seven places to a current peak of number two.

In January 2011, the single made a return to the UK top 100, reaching number 63 in the first week of the new year.

Track listing

 UK CD single
 "She Said" – 3:31
 "She Said" (16 Bit remix) – 4:36
 "She Said" (Shy FX remix) – 4:22
 "She Said" (Shy FX dub) – 4:22

 UK 7" vinyl
 "She Said" – 3:31
 "She Said" (16 Bit remix) – 4:36

 Digital download
 "She Said" – 3:28

 Digital download – single
 "She Said" (live Café de Paris) – 3:41
 "She Said" (16 Bit remix) – 4:33

 Digital download – EP
 "She Said" – 3:28
 "She Said" (live Café de Paris) – 3:41
 "She Said" (Shy FX remix) – 4:19
 "She Said" (Shy FX dub) – 4:19
 "She Said" (16 Bit remix) – 4:33

Personnel

 Plan B – vocals, producer, mixing

Production
 David McEwan – producer, mixing
 Eric Appapoulay – additional producer, mixing
 Sally Herbert – string arrangements
 Jason Yarde – brass arrangements
 Mark "Top" Rankin – engineer
 Guy Davie – mastering

Additional musicians
 Tom Wright-Goss – guitar
 Eric Appapoulay – bass, backing vocals
 Richard Cassell – drums
 Everton Newson – violin
 Louisa Fuller – violin
 Sally Herbert – violin
 Warren Zielinski – violin
 Bruce White – viola
 Sonia Slany – viola
 Ian Burdge – cello
 Jason Yarde – alto saxophone, baritone saxophone
 Zem Audu – tenor saxophone
 Harry Brown – trombone
 David Prisemen – trumpet, flugelhorn
 Mark Crown – trumpet

Charts and certifications

Weekly charts

Year-end charts

Certifications

Release history

See also
List of number-one R&B hits of 2010 (UK)

References

External links
 
 
 

2010 singles
679 Artists singles
Atlantic Records UK singles
Plan B (musician) songs
Songs written by Plan B (musician)
2010 songs